Ōtorohanga College is a coeducational state secondary school in Ōtorohanga, New Zealand. It was established as Otorohanga District High School in 1895. The school includes a Monday-to-Friday boarding hostel, Falloon House, opened in 1975, for students from outlying areas who return home each weekend.

History

Acknowledgment of Land Wars 
In 2015, select Ōtorohanga College students were among the hundreds who met at parliament to push for a day to remember the Land Wars (New Zealand's Civil War of the mid 1840s to early 1870s.) Among the Ōtorohanga College students was year 13 Leah Bell, who stated to Stuff, "We decided that it was our responsibility now to take action and be proactive about our history. We petitioned absolutely everywhere and we've ended up with almost 13,000 signatures. ...I guess we're also proud of New Zealand and of who we are – that we will pull together and support each other in this way."

COVID-19 pandemic

On 9 November 2020, Ōtorohanga College closed down its hostel after health authorities confirmed that a positive COVID-19 case had visited the facility while traveling from Wellington to Ōtorohanga and Kawhia.

Notable alumni 

 Phil Amos, politician
 Kevin Eveleigh, rugby union player
 Koro Wētere, politician
 Toby Arnold, rugby player
 Jackson Willison, rugby union player

References

External links 

Boarding schools in New Zealand
Secondary schools in Waikato
Educational institutions established in 1895
1895 establishments in New Zealand